A list of avant-garde and experimental films made in the 1930s. Unless where noted, all films had sound and were in black and white.

Bibliography
 Jan Christopher Horak, ed. Lovers of Cinema: The First American Avant-Garde, University of Wisconsin Press, Madison WI 1995
 Lovers of Cinema: The First American Avant-Garde, 1919–1945. University of Wisconsin Press, 1998. 
 Paul Rotha and Roger Manvell, "Movie Parade: A Pictorial Survey of the Cinema" London: The Studio, 1936
 Parker Tyler, "Underground Film: A Critical History" New York: Da Capo Press, 1995 (originally published in 1969)
 David Curtis, "Experimental Cinema" New York: Universe Books, 1970
 Bruce Posner, ed. Unseen Cinema: Early American Avant-Garde Film, Black Thistle Press/Anthology Film Archives, NYC 2001

References

1930s
Avant-garde